Segachama is a rural locality (a passing loop) in Rabochy Posyolok Erofey Pavlovich of Skovorodinsky District, Amur Oblast, Russia. The population was 45 as of 2018.

Geography 
Segachama is located 168 km west of Skovorodino (the district's administrative centre) by road. Bolshaya Omutnaya is the nearest rural locality.

References 

Rural localities in Skovorodinsky District